Dinoseb is a common industry name for 6-sec-butyl-2,4-dinitrophenol, a herbicide in the dinitrophenol family. It is a crystalline orange solid which does not readily dissolve in water. Dinoseb is banned as an herbicide in the European Union (EU) and the United States because of its toxicity.

It also finds use as a polymerisation inhibitor, where it is often referred to as DNBP. It is used to prevent the thermally induced polymerisation of styrene and other unsaturated monomers when they are being purified by distillation.

History
In 1892, dinitro-ortho-cresol (2,4-dinitro-6-methylphenol), a chemical compound closely related to dinoseb, was discovered in Germany and first used as an insecticide. It was later also used as an herbicide and also fungicide after those characteristics were discovered. In 1945 the ortho-methyl group was replaced by a sec-butyl group, producing dinoseb. This compound had a superior contact and stomach activity on insects and mites. Dinoseb became commercially available in 1945 and was approved for use in the United States based on safety data from Industrial Bio-Test Laboratories. On January 13, 1984 the Danish ship Dana Optima lost 80 drums of Dinoseb during their trip from North Shields, England to Esbjerg, Denmark. After four months 72 drums were found and recovered. Dinoseb was withdrawn from the market in 1986 due to an increased threat of birth defects after female field workers were exposed to the chemical. It could also cause sterility in men who were exposed to the chemical.

Uses 
Dinoseb is an herbicide that was once widely used for weed-control when producing crops like soybeans, vegetables, fruits and nuts, or citrus. In the present, dinoseb is banned in the EU, and the United States due to its high toxicity. However, dinoseb is still used in China for example; evidenced by the fact that it is found in rain- and drinking water. Nowadays there are other, safer herbicides that can be used. Dinoseb was also used as an insecticide to protect grapes. On the internet, dinoseb and other dinitrophenols are bought as weight-loss pills. It is very dangerous however, and many people have died of accidental overdose.

Mechanism of action 

Dinoseb is an uncoupler of oxidative phosphorylation. It is a weak acid that can pass through lipid membranes when it's in the undissociated form.

It uses this property to transport protons through the inner mitochondrial membrane (IMM). Protons are taken up from the intermembrane space and after transport through the IMM, they are released again in the mitochondrial matrix. Dinoseb in the dissociated form is negatively charged, which causes it to move to the intermembrane space because of the electrochemical gradient that exists across the IMM. The negative charge is delocalized over the ring, increasing the anion's membrane permeability.

By lowering the proton gradient, dinoseb removes the cell's ability to produce ATP, resulting in the death of the cell.

Dinoseb is also a weak inhibitor of mitochondrial Complex III and Complex II of the repiratory chain.

In plants, dinoseb also inhibits photosynthesis by inhibiting the electron flow from photocomplex II to plastoquinone. As a result, the plastoquinone can't create a proton gradient and no ATP is produced by the ATP synthase. Also, NADP can't be reduced to form NADPH, which removes the ability to create glucose from carbon dioxide. This also leads to cell death.

Metabolism and biotransformation 

After oral administration of dinoseb tagged with 14C  to rats and mice, it turned out that 40 to 65% of the 14C was excreted in the urine and 30 to 40% ended up in the feces. TLC data showed the presence of different metabolites of dinoseb, although these were not identified. This finding was confirmed by different in vitro and in vivo studies.

During one study, 14C-dinoseb was administered to pregnant mice. The data showed that the rate of absorption after intraperitoneal administration was much higher than after an oral administration. Furthermore, molecules containing 14C were found in all tissues of the mother and the embryo, although the embryonic tissues contained a lower concentration.

Three hours after oral or intraperitoneal administration, the 14C in the kidneys and liver of the mother was about 50% dinoseb and 50% metabolites. However, the 14C in the kidneys and liver of the embryo was 85% dinoseb after oral administration and 57% after intraperitoneal administration.

Toxicity 
Dinoseb is highly toxic when ingesting, inhaling or at skin contact. Symptoms include fatigue, sweating, headaches, nausea, stomach aches and fever. It is also an irritant for the eyes. Skin contact causes burns and it turns yellow. For pregnant women this substance is especially dangerous as it can cause growth defects in unborn children (it is teratogenic).

Dinoseb interferes with the oxidative phosphorylation by acting as an uncoupler, which is the production of ATP in the mitochondria. This is done by making the inner membrane of the mitochondria more permeable to protons. The protons can return to the mitochondrial matrix more easily, which results in a lower difference in proton concentration on either side of the inner mitochondrial membrane. In other words: The proton gradient is lower, so the membrane potential will be lower. As the membrane potential is the driving force for the production of ATP, the cell is unable to produce energy.

Exposure to dinoseb also induces ER-mediated calcium release, resulting in increased intracellular calcium levels. This is followed by activation of caspase, which is a protease involved in cell apoptosis. The surviving cells have an increase of alpha-synuclein levels which leads to dopaminergic neurodegeneration.

Dinoseb can cross biological membranes like the blood-brain barrier and the placental barrier. This explains why dinoseb is particularly dangerous for pregnant women. If the compound can pass the placental barrier, the unborn child will be exposed to dinoseb via the blood of the mother.

Oral LD50 values of dinoseb range from 14 to 114 mg/kg in rats, mice, rabbits, and guinea pigs. For humans, this is 5–50 mg/kg.

Effects on animals 
Dinoseb is not only a toxic compound for human but also for animals such as rats, fish and birds.

Rats: Dinoseb causes acute toxicity in rats after a single dose after circa fourteen days. About 50% of the rats die when they are given 25–28 mg/kg dinoseb orally. Much more is needed when the rats are exposed to dinoseb via the skin. In this case 50% dies when the rats are exposed to 80 mg/kg. When the dinoseb is injected a dose of 20 mg/kg will cause death of 50% of the rats. But also for rats turned out dinoseb was capable to go through the placenta and therefore causes embryotoxic and teratogenic effects.

Fish: Dinoseb is also highly toxic for fish, because fish are able to take up dinoseb very quickly. For small fish like goldfish only 0,4 ppm is needed to kill all fish in the water. When a fish lives in an acidic water environment dinoseb is more toxic than when a fish lives in a neutral or alkaline water environment. This is because dinoseb is slightly acidic.

Birds: It was found that dinoseb was also highly toxic to birds. When birds are given a single dose between 7–9 mg/kg around 50% of the birds dies. The most birds are exposed to dinoseb via the small streams of water.

Research has also shown that dinoseb is carcinogenic for female mice, but not for male mice.

First aid measures 
Nowadays dinoseb is banned in a lot of places in the world due to high incidences of birth defects. Because of this ban not a lot of people are exposed to dinoseb anymore. But when someone is exposed, a few things can be done as first aid. The victim can be exposed via four ways: inhalation, skin, eyes, ingestion. These are the first aid measures for the four ways of exposure:

Inhalation: The victim should get some fresh air. When needed the victim can be administered oxygen and assisted ventilation. Bronchospasm can be treated with beta2 agonist and corticosteroid aerosols.

Skin: The contaminated clothing and jewellery should be removed from the victim. The victim's skin, hair and nails should be washed thoroughly with soap several times.

Eyes: The victim's eyes should be immediately rinsed with running water. This is needed for at least 20 minutes. The contact lenses should be removed if possible.

Ingestion: The victim's mouth should be rinsed at first. The victim should be given charcoal as a slurry (240 ml water/30 g charcoal). This is only possible when the victim is conscious.

In all of the four cases the victim should see a doctor.

Chemistry

Synthesis 
The first step in the synthesis of dinoseb is the synthesis of 2-(1-methylpropyl)phenol from 1-butene and phenol. First, 1-butene is protonated so that a secondary carbocation is formed. This can only happen under acidic conditions. The formed carbocation can undergo electrophilic aromatic substitution with phenol. The product of this reaction is 2-(1-methylpropyl)phenol.

The second step in the synthesis of dinoseb is the nitration of 2-(1-methylpropyl)phenol. First, the nitronium ion is formed from nitric acid and sulfuric acid.

2-(1-methylpropyl)phenol takes up the nitronium ion to form the arenium ion, which has three resonance structures. Water can cleave off the additional proton to form a neutral compound.

The product of this reaction can undergo a second nitration to form dinoseb.

Stereoisomerism
Dinoseb is a racemic mixture of two enantiomers.

See also
 Dinoterb

References

External links
 US EPA datasheet

Herbicides
Dinitrophenols
Uncoupling agents